Gutach is a river of Baden-Württemberg, Germany. It passes through Triberg im Schwarzwald and Gutach (Schwarzwaldbahn), and flows into the Kinzig near Hausach. The Triberg Waterfalls are formed by the Gutach.

See also
List of rivers of Baden-Württemberg

References

Rivers of Baden-Württemberg
Rivers of the Black Forest
Rivers of Germany